Bhabesh Kalita (born 1 March 1972) is an Indian politician and businessman of Bharatiya Janata Party from Assam who is serving as the President of BJP, Assam state unit since 2021. He represents the Rangiya constituency in the Assam Legislative Assembly since 2016. He joined the BJP in 1991 and was secretary of the BJP,Assam state unit in 2006 to 2011 and general secretary from 2011. He was Minister of State (Independent Charge) for Irrigation  and Minister of State for Education in Sarbananda Sonowal ministry from 2016 to 2021.

References 

Living people
Year of birth missing (living people)
21st-century Indian politicians
People from Kamrup district
Assam MLAs 2021–2026
Members of the Assam Legislative Assembly
Bharatiya Janata Party politicians from Assam